Lists of Major League Baseball stolen base leaders include:

 List of Major League Baseball annual stolen base leaders 
 List of Major League Baseball career stolen bases leaders